Fetakgomo Tubatse Local Municipality is a local municipality of South Africa. It was established after the August 2016 local elections by the merging of Fetakgomo and Greater Tubatse local municipalities.

Politics 
The municipal council consists of seventy-seven members elected by mixed-member proportional representation. Thirty-nine councillors are elected by first-past-the-post voting in thirty-nine wards, while the remaining thirty-eight are chosen from party lists so that the total number of party representatives is proportional to the number of votes received. In the election of 3 August 2016, the African National Congress (ANC) won a majority of fifty-four seats on the council.
The following table shows the results of the election.

References

External links
 

Local municipalities of the Sekhukhune District Municipality